Irish Shipping Ltd operated two steamships with the name Irish Oak:

 
 

Ship names